"Schwarz zu blau" (German for "Black to Blue") is a song released in 2009 by German reggae-dancehall-hip hop musician Peter Fox. It was the third single of his only studio album Stadtaffe and reached number three in Germany.

In 2009, Peter Fox, representing Berlin, won the Bundesvision Song Contest with the song, held in February that year in Potsdam.

Charts

Weekly charts

Year-end charts

Certifications

References

2009 singles
2008 songs
Songs written by Peter Fox (musician)
Warner Records singles